"Perfect" is a song by Swedish singer Darin. It was released as the lead single from Darin's third studio album, Break the News, in Sweden on 18 October 2006.

Music video
The accompanying music video shows a teenage girl, watching a video of Darin performing the song, dancing in her bedroom while different colored backgrounds in her bedroom are projected. The video ends with Darin emerging from the TV, subsequently standing face to face with the girl.

Formats and track listings
CD single
"Perfect" — 3:00
"Perfect" (instrumental) — 2:59

Charts

References

2006 singles
Darin (singer) songs
Dance-pop songs
Songs written by Robbie Nevil
Songs written by Fredrik Thomander
Songs written by Anders Wikström (songwriter)
2006 songs
Columbia Records singles